Gymnastics was inducted at the Youth Olympic Games at the inaugural edition in 2010. Since the first edition, three disciplines are contested: artistic gymnastics and trampoline gymnastics—both for boys and girls, and rhythmic gymnastics only for girls. In 2018, acrobatic gymnastics will join the programme, as well as an international team competition gathering gymnasts from all disciplines.

Summary

Medal table
As of the 2018 Summer Youth Olympics.

Medals

Acrobatic gymnastics

Mixed pairs

Artistic gymnastics

Boys' events

All-around

Floor exercise

Pommel horse

Rings

Vault

Parallel bars

Horizontal bar

Girls' events

All-around

Vault

Uneven bars

Balance beam

Floor exercise

Multi-discipline

Mixed team

Rhythmic gymnastics

Individual all-around

Group all-around

Trampoline gymnastics

Boys' individual

Girls' individual

See also
Gymnastics at the Summer Olympics

External links
Youth Olympic Games

 
Youth Olympics
Gymnastics